Jordan Evans may refer to:

 Jordan Evans (soccer) (born 1987), American soccer player
 Jordan Evans (footballer) (born 1995), Welsh footballer
 Jordan Evans (American football) (born 1995), American football player
 Jordan Evans (politician), politician from Massachusetts
 Jordan Evans (record producer) (born 1991), Canadian hip hop and R&B producer